Sankt Veit is the German name for Saint Vitus in place names (cf. wiktionary:Sankt).

Places named Sankt Veit in Austria include:

 Sankt Veit an der Glan, Carinthia
 Sankt Veit an der Glan (district), Carinthia
 Sankt Veit an der Gölsen, Lower Austria
 Sankt Veit im Pongau, Salzburg
 Sankt Veit am Vogau, Styria
 Sankt Veit in Defereggen, Tyrol
 Sankt Veit im Innkreis, Upper Austria
 Sankt Veit im Mühlkreis, Upper Austria
 Sankt Veit in der Gegend, Styria
 The Ober Sankt Veit and Unter Sankt Veit (now part of Hietzing) neighborhoods in Vienna, formerly known as Sankt Veit an der Wien.

Other places named Sankt Veit include:

 Neumarkt-Sankt Veit, Bavaria, Germany
 St. Vith (Sankt Veit in German), Liège, Belgium
 Canton of Sankt-Vith (Sankt Veit in German), Belgium; part of Eupen Sankt Vith
 Sankt Veit am Flaum, Istria, Croatia

See also

 St. Vitus's Church, for churches named Sankt Veit